Liao Chengjian (Chinese: 廖承坚; Pinyin: Liào Chéngjiān; born 4 January 1993) is a Chinese professional football player who currently plays as a defender for Changchun Yatai.

Club career
Liao started his professional football career in 2011 when he was promoted to Shanghai Zobon's squad for the 2011 China League Two campaign. On 13 August 2011, he scored his first league goal in a 2–1 home defeat against Guangzhou Youth. He joined Chinese Super League side Shanghai Shenxin in June 2013. On 6 July 2013, he made his Super League debut in a 3–0 home defeat against Guangzhou Evergrande. He couldn't make any appearance for Shanghai Shenxin in the 2013 season after manager Zhu Jiong was sacked on 7 July. On 23 July 2014, Liao was loaned to China League One side Shijiazhuang Yongchang until 31 December 2014. On 1 July 2015, Liao was loaned to China League Two side Anhui Litian until 31 December 2015.

In March 2016, Liao transferred to China League Two side Heilongjiang Lava Spring. He would go on to establish himself as regular within the team and went on to win the  2017 China League Two with the club.

Career statistics 
Statistics accurate as of match played 31 December 2020.

Honours

Club
Heilongjiang Lava Spring
China League Two: 2017

References

External links
 

1993 births
Living people
Chinese footballers
Footballers from Shanghai
Pudong Zobon players
Shanghai Shenxin F.C. players
Cangzhou Mighty Lions F.C. players
Heilongjiang Ice City F.C. players
Association football defenders
Chinese Super League players
China League One players
China League Two players
21st-century Chinese people